The British Sign Language Act 2022 (c. 34) is an Act of the Parliament of the United Kingdom.

Passage 
The British Sign Language Bill was introduced to the House of Commons as a private members' bill on 16 June 2021 by Rosie Cooper. The Bill gained cross-party and Government support before passing its second and third reading in the House of Commons and Lords without any difficulties. It received royal assent on 28 April 2022.

Legal effect 
The Act legally recognises British Sign Language as a language of England, Scotland and Wales, a similar status to Welsh and Scottish Gaelic. It requires the government to publish reports on how the language is used in its public communications and issue guidance on promoting its usage. It is somewhat modelled in motives on the British Sign Language (Scotland) Act 2015 which places similar requirements on ministers in the Scottish Government.

References

Citations

Bibliography 

 

United Kingdom Acts of Parliament 2022
British Sign Language
Language legislation
Language policy in the United Kingdom